KIAA1024 like is a protein that in humans is encoded by the KIAA1024L gene.

References

Further reading